Marcelo Andrés Valencia Saraiva (born 17 May 2002) is a Guatemalan professional footballer who plays as a defensive midfielder for Liga Nacional club Antigua.

Career

Nottingham Forest
Saraiva joined the Nottingham Forest under-23's side on 7 January 2021, signing a contract until June 2022. Saraiva had previously played with Brazilian sides Flamengo and Internacional, but left the latter club in September 2020 to pursue opportunities in Europe following a successful application for a Portuguese passport. On 10 June 2022, Nottingham Forest announced that Saraiva would be leaving the club once his contract expired.

International
Saraiva has represented Guatemala at the under-17 level in 2019, before playing with the senior Guatemala national team against Puerto Rico in the CONCACAF Nations League in November 2019.

Personal
Marcelo is the son of former Brazilian footballer Marcelo Henrique Saraiva and Lourdes Valencia, who belongs to a family of renowned Guatemalan footballers including Everaldo Valencia, who also played for the Guatemalan National Team.

References

2002 births
Living people
Association football midfielders
Guatemalan footballers
Guatemala international footballers
Sport Club Internacional players
Nottingham Forest F.C. players
Guatemalan expatriate footballers
Expatriate footballers in England